Lahti Stadium is a multi-use stadium in Lahti, Finland. In Winter the stadium is used in cross-country skiing and biathlon. In summer it is currently used mostly for football matches and is the home stadium of FC Lahti. The stadium holds 14,500 spectators and was built in 1981.

Lahti Stadium is a well-known venue for cross-country skiing and biathlon. Along with neighboring ski jumping hills, it has hosted three FIS Nordic World Ski Championships (1989, 2001 and 2017) and numerous Cross-Country World Cup events, the first being held on 6 March 1982. In biathlon, the stadium has been the venue for three World Championships (1981, 1991 and 2000) and also the World Cup for many years.

Gallery

External links
 

Football venues in Finland
Sport in Lahti
Buildings and structures in Päijät-Häme
Sports venues completed in 1981